Andrey Molchanov (born July 16, 1987) is an Olympic swimmer from Turkmenistan. He competed at the 2008 Olympics, where he finished 64th in the 50m freestyle.

He also swam at the 2007 World Championships.

References

1987 births
Living people
Turkmenistan male swimmers
Olympic swimmers of Turkmenistan
Swimmers at the 2008 Summer Olympics
Swimmers at the 2010 Asian Games
Asian Games competitors for Turkmenistan